Inga Stasiulionytė (born 29 June 1981 in Vilnius) is a Lithuanian-Monegasque javelin thrower. Her personal best throw is 62.27 metres, achieved in July 2005 in Kaunas.

Stasiulionytė finished sixth at the 1999 European Junior Championships and seventh at the 2005 Summer Universiade. She also competed at the 2005 World Championships and the 2008 Olympic Games without reaching the final round.

Stasiulionytė competes in AS Monaco Athletics Club which allowed her to represent Monaco in the Games of the Small States of Europe, where she won two silver medals in 2013 and 2015. With her results achieved in 2013 Games of the Small States of Europe she was 7th best javelin thrower in Lithuania in 2013.

Competition record

References

External links
 
 
 
 

1981 births
Living people
Lithuanian female javelin throwers
Monegasque female javelin throwers
Olympic athletes of Lithuania
Athletes (track and field) at the 2008 Summer Olympics
World Athletics Championships athletes for Lithuania
Competitors at the 2003 Summer Universiade
Competitors at the 2005 Summer Universiade
Lithuanian emigrants to Monaco
Expatriates in Monaco
Sportspeople from Vilnius